The quantum vacuum state or simply quantum vacuum refers to the quantum state with the lowest possible energy.

Quantum vacuum may also refer to:

 Quantum chromodynamic vacuum (QCD vacuum),  a non-perturbative vacuum
 Quantum electrodynamic vacuum (QED vacuum), a field-theoretic vacuum
 Quantum vacuum (ground state), the state of lowest energy of a quantum system
 Quantum vacuum collapse, a hypothetical vacuum metastability event
 Quantum vacuum expectation value, an operator's average, expected value in a quantum vacuum
 Quantum vacuum energy, an underlying background energy that exists in space throughout the entire Universe
 The Quantum Vacuum, a physics textbook by Peter W. Milonni

See also
 Quantum fluctuation
 Quantum foam
 Quantum vacuum thruster
 Virtual particle
 Zero-point energy